Prism (stylized as _PRISM) is a minimalist puzzle game by Clint Siu which was released on iOS and later released on Android.

Gameplay 
Prism tasks the player with manipulating 3D shapes. Each level of game consists of the player solving puzzles on a geometric shape (that resembles a planet) to reveal the central core which allows the player to advance. The puzzles are solved by tapping, sliding and spinning the symbols on the surfaces of the shape into the correct spots.

Reception 
Prism received positive reviews. TouchArcade rated the game as 4.5 stars out of 5 praising the fact that the game "really is gorgeous, especially if you have a newer device that can smoothly handle all of its glowing, shimmering beauty". AppleNApps gave the game 4.5 stars out of 5 praising the game's "immserive puzzles", "tactile UI" and "beautiful 3D design" while critiquing the game's short length and that the game has "a few touch hiccups". Pocket Gamer compared the game to The Room but said it was "an abstract retooling of The Room" and was "missing the discovery aspect". Metacritic gave the game the averaged score of 84 out of 100 (generally favorable reviews).

References

External links 
 
Fullstack

IOS games
Android (operating system) games